The 2000 United States presidential election in Utah took place on November 7, 2000, as part of the 2000 United States presidential election. Voters chose five representatives, or electors to the Electoral College, who voted for president and vice president.

Utah was won by Texas Governor George W. Bush by a 40.49 percent margin of victory. With 66.83 percent of the popular vote, the state proved to be Bush's third strongest state in the 2000 election after neighboring Wyoming and Idaho. The state also proved to be Gore's worst performing state.

Results

Results by county

Counties that flipped from Democratic to Republican
Carbon (Largest city: Price)
Summit (Largest city: Park City)
Tooele (Largest city: Tooele)

By congressional district
Bush won all 3 congressional districts, including one held by a Democrat.

Electors

Technically the voters of Utah cast their ballots for electors: representatives to the Electoral College. Utah is allocated five electors because it has three congressional districts and two senators. All candidates who appear on the ballot or qualify to receive write-in votes must submit a list of five electors, who pledge to vote for their candidate and his or her running mate. Whoever wins the majority of votes in the state is awarded all five electoral votes. Their chosen electors then vote for president and vice president. Although electors are pledged to their candidate and running mate, they are not obligated to vote for them. An elector who votes for someone other than his or her candidate is known as a faithless elector.

The electors of each state and the District of Columbia met on December 18, 2000 to cast their votes for president and vice president. The Electoral College itself never meets as one body. Instead the electors from each state and the District of Columbia met in their respective capitols. 

The following were the members of the Electoral College from the state. All were pledged to and voted for George W. Bush and Dick Cheney:
Michael Leavitt
Olene Walker
Lewis Billings
Arlene Ellis
Ron Fox

See also
 United States presidential elections in Utah
 Presidency of George W. Bush

References

Utah
2000
2000 Utah elections